Dan Negru (born 23 February 1971) is a Romanian TV presenter and host of the Romanian version of Star Factory.

Host
He has hosted the following TV shows:

 "Academia Vedetelor'
 "Next Star”
 "Plasa de stele”
 "Beat the Blondes (Te pui cu blondele?)
 "Demascarea”
 "Let's make a deal"(Batem Palma)
 "Ciao Darwin"
 "Ziua Judecății"
 "Competitia"
 "Genialii"
 "Money Drop"(Cu banii jos)
 "Minute to win it" ( Castigi in 60 de minute)

 "Jeux sans frontiers/Saint Tropez Games"(Jocuri la Saint Tropez)
 Festivaluri Mamaia,(1999 impreuna cu Andreea Marin) Callatis ( impreuna cu Gabriel Cotabita), Eurovison,
 "Vreau sa fiu mare vedeta"
 "Vreau sa fiu stewardesa"
 "Divizia-Gazeta Sporturilor"
 "O seara de vis" impreuna cu Mihaela Radulescu
 "Serifi de Romania"
 "Echipa Fantastica"
 Teledon-2001-2009, Teledon "Colectiv"-2015 impreuna cu Mihai Gadea
 Revelioane 1999–present 
 Guess my age- Ghiceste-mi varsta-2018 
 "Who want s to be a millionaire" ("Vrei sa fii milionar?)
 "Star Academy" (Fabrica de Staruri)
 "Deal or no deal"( Da sau Nu)

References

External links 
  Dan Negru's blog

Notes
 Un dobitoc!(dex-animal patruped)

1971 births
Living people
Romanian television personalities